Kenneth A. Reid (March 17, 1919 – June 30, 1996) was an American art director. He was nominated for an Academy Award in the category Best Art Direction for the film The Facts of Life.

Selected filmography
 The Facts of Life (1960)

References

External links

American art directors
1919 births
1996 deaths